Emanuel Alejandro Andrade Colmenares (born 11 September 1996) is a Venezuelan Olympic show jumping rider.

Career 
He competed at the 2016 Summer Olympics in Rio de Janeiro where he finished 61st in the individual competition, collecting 13 penalties in total during the first qualification round.

Andrade competed at the 2014 World Equestrian Games, where he placed 19th in the team and 70th in the individual jumping competition. He also participated at several regional games, including the 2015 Pan American Games.

Personal life 
Andrade's father Alejandro Andrade, convicted thief and money launderer, raided hundreds of millions of dollars from his native country of Venezuela before being raided by the FBI and leaving Andrade family members, Emanuel included, "as broke and destitute as the country they embezzled from and then abandoned." All of Andrade's horses were seized by the FBI in 2018, as they had been purchased by his father with money from bribes.

He came out in an Instagram post in 2018.

References

Living people
1996 births
Venezuelan male equestrians
Equestrians at the 2016 Summer Olympics
Equestrians at the 2015 Pan American Games
Olympic equestrians of Venezuela
Pan American Games competitors for Venezuela
Central American and Caribbean Games silver medalists for Venezuela
Central American and Caribbean Games bronze medalists for Venezuela
Competitors at the 2014 Central American and Caribbean Games
Venezuelan gay men
Venezuelan LGBT sportspeople
Gay sportsmen
LGBT equestrians
Central American and Caribbean Games medalists in equestrian
20th-century Venezuelan people
21st-century Venezuelan people